Leopold "Leo" Ross is an English musician, record producer, recording engineer and music programmer.

Leopold is a guitarist in LA based band Io Echo.

Career
Leopold was a founding member of eclectic rock band Nojahoda who released one album on Sony S2 Records in 1999.

In 2003 he joined his brother Atticus Ross, as well as Bad Religion member Brett Gurewitz in the punk/hardcore band Error. Along with temporary vocalist Greg Puciato, the band recorded and released a well received EP on Epitaph Records in 2004. Around this time Leopold also began his scoring career, composing the music for the USA Network show Touching Evil alongside Atticus Ross and Claudia Sarne.

Leopold has since gone on to score numerous motion pictures and television shows, beginning in 2009 with the Hughes brothers' movie The Book of Eli. In May 2010 this score won a BMI film music award.

Outside of his scoring work, Leopold has written, recorded, produced and performed with various noted acts including Bad Religion, Grace Jones, Korn, Dillinger Escape Plan, Rancid, The Transplants, Five Finger Death Punch, Brigitte Fontaine, The Big Pink, Io Echo and Brett Anderson.

Personal life
Ross has five siblings, including model Liberty Ross and Atticus Ross, who is also a musician. His maternal grandfather was Miles Lampson, 1st Baron Killearn. He is of Italian descent through his great-grandfather, Aldo Castellani.

Selected credits

References

English record producers
English audio engineers
English composers
Living people
Place of birth missing (living people)
Year of birth missing (living people)
English rock guitarists
Fear and the Nervous System members
English people of Italian descent
British people of Italian descent